Zeng Chao (born 23 January 1993) is a Chinese footballer who currently plays for Guangzhou R&F in the Chinese Super League.

Club career
Zeng Chao started his football career when he joined Shandong Luneng's youth academy with Liu Binbin in 2005. He played for China League Two side Shandong Youth in 2011 and 2012. Failing to promote to the first team, Zeng transferred to Chinese Super League side Guangzhou R&F in 2014. He was loaned to China League One side Guangdong Sunray Cave for half season in July 2014. He played 14 matches and scored 2 goals in the 2014 season as Guangdong Sunray Cave avoided to relegate to the third tier. 

Zeng was promoted to Guangzhou R&F's first team squad in July 2015. He made his Super League debut on 23 April 2016 against Jiangsu Suning, coming on for Tang Miao in the 80th minute. He scored his Super League goal two minutes after the substitution, which ensured Guangzhou R&F tied with Jiangsu Suning 1–1. He scored three goals in 22 league appearances in the 2016 season and extended his contract with the club for five years on 7 November 2016.

Zeng transferred to his hometown club Meizhou Meixian Techand who newly promoted to China League One on 1 January 2018. On 10 March 2018, he made his debut for the club in the season's opener against Yanbian Funde. On 7 November 2018, he scored his first goal in a 1–1 away draw against Shaanxi Chang'an Athletic in the first leg of 2018 China League One Relegation play-offs.

Career statistics 
.

References

External links
 

1993 births
Living people
Hakka sportspeople
Association football defenders
Chinese footballers
Footballers from Meizhou
Guangdong South China Tiger F.C. players
Guangdong Sunray Cave players
Guangzhou City F.C. players
Chinese Super League players
China League One players
China League Two players